This article shows the rosters of all participating teams at the 2015 FIVB Volleyball Women's Club World Championship in Zurich, Switzerland.

Pool A

Rexona Ades
The following is the roster of the Brazilian club Rexona Ades Rio de Janeiro in the 2015 FIVB Volleyball Women's Club World Championship.

Head coach:  Bernardo Rezende

Voléro Zürich
The following is the roster of the Swiss club Voléro Zürich in the 2015 FIVB Volleyball Women's Club World Championship.

Head coach:  Avital Selinger

Mirador
The following is the roster of the Dominican Republic club Mirador Santo Domingo in the 2015 FIVB Volleyball Women's Club World Championship.

Head coach:  Marcos Kwiek

Pool B

Eczacıbaşı VitrA
The following is the roster of the Turkish club Eczacıbaşı VitrA Istanbul in the 2015 FIVB Volleyball Women's Club World Championship.

Head coach:  Giovanni Caprara

Hisamitsu Springs
The following is the roster of the Japanese club Hisamitsu Springs Kobe in the 2015 FIVB Volleyball Women's Club World Championship.

Head coach:  Kumi Nakada

Dinamo Krasnodar
The following is the roster of the Russian club Dinamo Krasnodar in the 2015 FIVB Volleyball Women's Club World Championship.

Head coach:  Konstantin Ushakov

See also
2015 FIVB Volleyball Men's Club World Championship squads

References

External links
Official website

2015 in volleyball
C